Brigitte Broch, born November 21, 1943, is a German-Mexican production designer.

Personal life
Broch is a naturalized citizen of Mexico.

Oscar nominations
Both of these are in Best Art Direction

69th Academy Awards-Nominated for Romeo + Juliet. Nomination shared with Catherine Martin. Lost to The English Patient.
74th Academy Awards-Moulin Rouge!. Won. Shared with Catherine Martin.

Selected filmography

 Romeo + Juliet (1996)
 Amores Perros (2000)
 Moulin Rouge! (2001)
 Real Women Have Curves (2002)
 21 Grams (2003)
 Babel (2006)
 The Reader (2008)
 Vantage Point (2008)
 Biutiful (2010)
 Safe House (2012)

References

External links

Best Art Direction Academy Award winners
Living people
Set decorators
1943 births
People from Koszalin
People from the Province of Pomerania
German emigrants to Mexico
Naturalized citizens of Mexico